Kate Fisher  may refer to:
 Big Nose Kate
Kate Fisher (model)

See also
Catherine Fisher (disambiguation)